Al-Shirqat is a town west of the Tigris in Saladin Governorate, Iraq, located 294 kilometres (183 mi) northwest of Baghdad. It is the main town of the Al-Shirqat District, and is near the ruins of the ancient Assyrian city of Assur.

History
In 1918 the Battle of Sharqat between British and  Ottoman forces was fought at the town. 

The Islamic State of Iraq and the Levant took control of the town during their June 2014 offensive. In June 2016, Iraqi forces moved towards the town.

The senior Islamic State military commander Abu Omar al-Shishani was reported to have been killed in fighting in al-Shirqat in July 2016. On 22 September 2016, Iraqi security forces recaptured the town from ISIL. More than 160,000 people were displaced from Sharqat due to Islamic State's occupation of  the town.

Climate
Al-Shirqat has a hot semi-arid climate (Köppen climate classification BSh). Most rain falls in the winter. About  of precipitation falls annually.

References

Populated places in Saladin Governorate